WTLK (1570 AM) is a radio station broadcasting a Southern Gospel format. Licensed to Taylorsville, North Carolina, United States.  The station is currently owned by Apple City Broadcasting.

External links

Southern Gospel radio stations in the United States
TLK